Stadl-Paura is a municipality in the Austrian state of Upper Austria located in the district Wels-Land. About half of it lies in the Hausruckviertel, the other half in the Traunviertel. Despite this fact the whole district Wels-Land is officially seen as a part of the Hausruckviertel.

References

Cities and towns in Wels-Land District